RERO can stand for:

 RERO, a library network of western Switzerland
 Release early, release often, a software development philosophy